Gustavo Monsanto (born 5 November 1974) is a Brazilian singer who is the former lead vocalist of the French progressive metal band Adagio, and former lead singer of Finnish band Revolution Renaissance formed by Timo Tolkki after he left Stratovarius. He is the brother of journalist Eduardo Monsanto of ESPN Brazil.

In 2009, he released an album as frontman of the band The Lightseekers.

Monsanto is lead vocalist for the German metal band Human Fortress and appeared on their albums Raided Land and Reign of Gold. He released his first solo debut album called Karma Café in 2016.

In 2022, Gus joins French heavy metal band Krysaor.

Discography

References 

Living people
21st-century Brazilian male singers
21st-century Brazilian singers
Brazilian heavy metal singers
1974 births
Revolution Renaissance members
Adagio (band) members
Takara (band) members